The 1998–99 Temple Owls men's basketball team represented Temple University as a member of the Atlantic 10 Conference during the 1998–99 NCAA Division I men's basketball season. The team was led by head coach John Chaney and played their home games at the Liacouras Center. The Owls received an at-large bid to the NCAA tournament as No. 6 seed in the East region. Temple made a run to the Elite Eight and finished with a record of 24–11 (13–3 A-10).

Roster

Schedule 

|-
!colspan=9 style=| Regular season

|-
!colspan=9 style=| Atlantic 10 Tournament

|-
!colspan=9 style=| NCAA Tournament

Rankings

References 

Temple Owls men's basketball seasons
Temple
Temple
Temple
Temple